Torbjørn Clausen (11 March 1931 – 23 December 2001) was a Norwegian boxer. He was born in Lørenskog. He competed at the 1952 Summer Olympics in Helsinki, where he shared fifth place in the flyweight class.

1952 Olympic results
Below is the record of Torbjørn Clausen, a Norwegian flyweight boxer who competed at the 1952 Helsinki Olympics:

 Round of 32: defeated Kjeld Steen (Denmark) by decision, 2-1
 Round of 16: bye
 Quarterfinal: lost to Edgar Basel (Germany) by a third-round technical knockout

References

External links

1931 births
2001 deaths
People from Lørenskog
Boxers at the 1952 Summer Olympics
Olympic boxers of Norway
Norwegian male boxers
Flyweight boxers
Sportspeople from Viken (county)
20th-century Norwegian people